Rhynocoris leucospilus is a species of assassin bug in the family Reduviidae. It is found in Europe and Northern Asia (excluding China) and North America.

Subspecies
These five subspecies belong to the species Rhynocoris leucospilus:
 Rhynocoris leucospilus altaicus Kiritshenko, 1926
 Rhynocoris leucospilus dybowski (Jakovlev, 1876)
 Rhynocoris leucospilus leucospilus
 Rhynocoris leucospilus rubromarginatus (Dispons & Stichel, 1893)
 Rhynocoris leucospilus sibiricus (Jakovlev, 1893)

References

Further reading

 

Reduviidae
Hemiptera of Asia
Hemiptera of Europe
Hemiptera of North America
Taxa named by Carl Stål
Insects described in 1859
Articles created by Qbugbot